XHWX-FM is a radio station that serves the state of Durango. It is owned by Radiorama and carries a grupera format known as La Poderosa.

History
XEWX-AM 660 received its concession on May 3, 1989. It migrated to FM in 2011.

External links
 Radiorama Durango official website

References

Regional Mexican radio stations
Radio stations in Durango
Mass media in Durango City